Rohaniya is a constituency of the Uttar Pradesh Legislative Assembly covering the city of Rohaniya in the Varanasi district of Uttar Pradesh, India.
It is a Patel-Bhumihar dominant seat. The constituency number is 387. 
Rohaniya is one of five assembly constituencies in the Varanasi Lok Sabha constituency. Since 2008, this assembly constituency is numbered 387 amongst 403 constituencies.ahsvzja usbsisy zisbsid is s is sis disbdid si zisbsid isbsis sisbis disbsi zisbsis usbs sisbsi zisbsiwbd dkns

Members of Legislative Assembly
Hay

Election results

2022

2017
Bharatiya Janta Party candidate Surendra Narayan Singh belonging to the Bhumihar community, won in 2017 Uttar Pradesh Legislative Elections defeating Samajwadi Party candidate Mahendra Singh Patel by a margin of 57,553 votes.

References

External links
 

Assembly constituencies of Uttar Pradesh
Politics of Varanasi district